Steffi Graf was the defending champion, but lost in the final to Monica Seles, 6–4, 6–3.

Seeds 
The top 8 seeds received a bye to the second round.

Draw

Finals

Top half

Section 1

Section 2

Bottom half

Section 1

Section 2

References

External links 
 ITF tournament edition details

Virginia Slims of Chicago
WTA German Open
May 1990 sports events in Europe
1990 in German tennis